Yeom Dong-cheol (born 9 November 1968) is a South Korean weightlifter. He competed in the men's light heavyweight event at the 1992 Summer Olympics.

References

1968 births
Living people
South Korean male weightlifters
Olympic weightlifters of South Korea
Weightlifters at the 1992 Summer Olympics
Place of birth missing (living people)
Asian Games medalists in weightlifting
Weightlifters at the 1990 Asian Games
Weightlifters at the 1994 Asian Games
Asian Games gold medalists for South Korea
Medalists at the 1990 Asian Games
20th-century South Korean people
21st-century South Korean people